Whitney is a small unincorporated community in the Cache Valley of Franklin County, Idaho, United States. It is part of the Logan, Utah-Idaho Metropolitan Statistical Area.

Close to the border with Utah, Whitney lies on U.S. 91 between Preston and Franklin, and is associated to the postal code of Preston (83263).

The place was named after Orson F. Whitney, an Apostle of the Church of Jesus Christ of Latter-day Saints.  At the time of the city's formation Whitney was a long time bishop in a Salt Lake City ward.

The community is almost entirely composed of members of The Church of Jesus Christ of Latter Day Saints. It was the birthplace of Church President Ezra Taft Benson, who is buried in the Whitney cemetery.

Brandon D Woolf, who assumed office as Idaho State Controller in 2012, was raised in Whitney.

The community is agricultural in character. Sugar beets were the main product in the early 20th century.

References

Unincorporated communities in Franklin County, Idaho
Unincorporated communities in Idaho
Logan metropolitan area